Totternhoe Stone Pit is a geological Site of Special Scientific Interest in Totternhoe in Bedfordshire, England. It is also a Geological Conservation Review site, and the local planning authority is Central Bedfordshire Council.

The site displays the base of the Totternhoe Stone. It is a lime mud with an extensive deposit of late Cretaceous shark teeth, some of species which have not been fully described, so it will be an important resource for further research. The lower levels contain larger teeth, and in upper ones there are some small rays.

The site is part of the Totternhoe nature reserve, managed by the Wildlife Trust for Bedfordshire, Cambridgeshire and Northamptonshire, but there is no public access to the Stone Pit.

References

Sites of Special Scientific Interest in Bedfordshire
Geological Conservation Review sites